Joseph Crisco is an American engineer, currently the Henry F. Lippitt Professor of Orthopedics and Professor of Engineering at Brown University and also Editor in Chief of Journal of Applied Biomechanics.

References

Year of birth missing (living people)
Living people
Brown University faculty
21st-century American engineers